Tildanga Union is a union parishad of Dacope Upazila in Khulna District of Bangladesh.

Educational institutions
 Battunia Collegiate Secondary School
 Mozam Nagar Secondary School
 Tildanga Union Secondary Girls' School
 Kaminibasia G,L, Secondary School
 Tildonga Secondary School
 Kakarabunia Sirajia Dakhil Madrasa

References

Unions of Dacope Upazila
Populated places in Khulna Division
Populated places in Khulna District